Tiit Sinissaar (born 7 September 1947 in Tartu) is an Estonian politician. He was a member of the VII, VIII and IX Riigikogu.

References

Living people
1947 births
Pro Patria Union politicians
Members of the Riigikogu, 1992–1995
Members of the Riigikogu, 1995–1999
Members of the Riigikogu, 1999–2003
University of Tartu alumni
Politicians from Tartu